Commerce Place may refer to four buildings:

Commerce Place (Baltimore)
Commerce Place (Edmonton)
Commerce Place I (Hamilton, Ontario)
Commerce Place II (Hamilton, Ontario)

See also
Commerce Square